Dham Dam, is an earthfill dam on Dham river near Arvi, Wardha district in state of Maharashtra in India.

Specifications
The reservoir shape resembles the shape of an imaginary dragon or a peacock shape in bird's eye view.
It is a spillway type dam without the gates.

Purpose
 Irrigation

See also
 Dams in Maharashtra
 List of reservoirs and dams in India

References

Dams in Wardha district
Dams completed in 1986
1986 establishments in Maharashtra
20th-century architecture in India